Colonel William Joseph (W.J.) "Joe" Aitchison, OMM, CD (born December 5, 1941) is a retired Canadian military officer, and former Colonel of the Regiment for the Royal Canadian Regiment. He is also a security consultant and member of the board of directors of several organizations. He received the 2008 J.J. Kelso Award from the Hastings Children's Aid Society for his work with the Ontario Association of Children's Aid Societies.

Life
Aitchison attended the Royal Military College of Canada and graduated with the class of 1963.
Throughout Aitchison's career he held several command appointments, including being the Commanding Officer of 2nd Battalion of The RCR, Commandant
of the Canadian Forces School of Infantry and Base Commander of CFB London, ON.

Aitchison has three sons, retired Master Warrant Officer Alan Aitchison, CD, Major General D. Craig Aitchison, CD, and Daniel, and five grandchildren, Justin, Colin, Kayla, Callie, and Alicia. Son Craig is a currently serving member of the Canadian Forces, while son Alan and grandson Justin are former serving members.  Craig is also an officer in The Royal Canadian Regiment and also commanded the Infantry School (2009–11), perhaps the first father-son to command the same unit in the Regiment's, if not Army's, history.

Aitchison became the new Colonel of the Royal Canadian Regiment on February 25, 2011. On June 18, 2015, Aitchison handed over this position to his successor, Major-General (Retired) J.I. Fenton, OMM, CD.

He currently resides in Southern Ontario.

Honours and decorations
Aitchison received the following orders and decorations during his military career:

References

Royal Canadian Regiment officers
Royal Military College of Canada alumni
Living people
1941 births
People from Lennox and Addington County